Johnnycake, also known as journey cake, johnny bread, hoecake,  shawnee cake or  spider cornbread, is a cornmeal flatbread, a type of batter bread. An early American staple food, it is prepared on the Atlantic coast from Newfoundland to Jamaica. The food originates from the indigenous people of North America. It is still eaten in the West Indies, Dominican Republic, Saint Croix, The Bahamas, Colombia, Bermuda, Curaçao and Puerto Rico as well as in the United States and Canada.

The modern johnnycake is found in the cuisine of New England and is often claimed as originating in Rhode Island. A modern johnnycake is fried cornmeal gruel, which is made from yellow or white cornmeal mixed with salt and hot water or milk, and sometimes sweetened. In the Southern United States, the term used is hoecake, although this can also refer to cornbread fried in a pan.

Etymology

Johnnycake
The earliest attestation of the term "johnny cake" is from 1739 (in South Carolina); the spelling "journey cake" is only attested from 1775 on the Gulf Coast, but may be the earlier form.

The word is likely based on the word Jonakin, recorded in New England in 1765, itself derived from the word jannock, recorded in Northern England in the sixteenth century. According to Edward Ellis Morris, the term was the name given "... by the [American] negroes to a cake made of Indian corn (maize)."

Another suggested derivation is that it comes from Shawnee cake, although some writers disagree.

Hoecake
The term hoecake is first attested in 1745, and the term is used by American writers such as Joel Barlow and Washington Irving. The origin of the name is the method of preparation: they were cooked on a type of iron pan called a hoe. There is conflicting evidence regarding the common belief that they were cooked on the blades of gardening hoes.

A hoecake can be made either out of cornbread batter or leftover biscuit dough. A cornbread hoecake is thicker than a cornbread pancake.

Origin
Indigenous peoples of the Americas using ground corn for cooking are credited with teaching Europeans how to make the food. It is also claimed that johnnycakes were made by the Narragansett people as far back as the 1600s.

From this culture came one of the main staples of the Southern diet: corn (maize). Corn was used to make all kinds of dishes from the familiar cornbread and grits to liquors such as whiskey and moonshine, which were important trade items. Cornbread was popular during the American Civil War because it was very cheap and could be made in many different sizes and forms.  It could be fashioned into high-rising, fluffy loaves or simply fried for a fast meal.

To a far greater degree than anyone realizes, several of the most important food dishes that the Southeastern Indians live on today is the "soul food" eaten by both black and white Southerners. Hominy, for example, is still eaten ... Sofkee live on as grits ... cornbread [is] used by Southern cooks ... Indian fritters ... variously known as "hoe cake", ... or "Johnny cake."... Indian boiled cornbread is present in Southern cuisine as "corn meal dumplings", ... and as "hush puppies", ... Southerners cook their beans and field peas by boiling them, as did the Indians ... like the Indians they cure their meat and smoke it over hickory coals.

Preparation

Johnnycakes are an unleavened cornbread made of cornmeal, salt, and water. Early cooks set thick corn dough on a wooden board or barrel stave, which they leaned on a piece of wood or a rock in front of an open fire to bake.

In the American south during the 18th century versions were made with rice or hominy flour and perhaps cassava. A 1905 cookbook includes a recipe for "Alabama Johnny Cake" made with rice and 'meal'.

The difference between johnnycake and hoecake originally lay in the method of preparation, though today both are often cooked on a griddle or in a skillet. Some recipes call for baking johnnycakes in an oven, similar to corn pones, which are still baked in the oven as they were traditionally.

Johnnycakes may also be made using leavening, with or without other ingredients more commonly associated with American pancakes, such as eggs or solid fats like butter. Like pancakes, they are often served with maple syrup, honey, or other sweet toppings.

According to the manuscript of America Eats, a Works Progress Administration (WPA) guide to American food culture in the beginning decades of the twentieth century, Rhode Island "jonny cakes" were made in the 1930s as follows:

In preparation, [white corn] meal may or may not be scalded with hot water or hot milk in accordance to preference. After mixing meal with water or milk it is dropped on a smoking hot spider [pan] set atop a stove into cakes about 3"x3"x1/2" in size. The secret of cooking jonny cakes is to watch them closely and keep them supplied with enough sausage or bacon fat so they will become crisp, and not burn. Cook slowly for half an hour, turn occasionally, and when done serve with plenty of butter.

Variations

Australia
In Australia, "johnny cakes" refers to a quick bread usually known as damper, but cooked as smaller, individually-sized portions, and often pan-fried, rather than as a loaf. It is uncertain if this name was influenced by the term for North American cornmeal bread. However, Australian johnny cakes are made with wheat flour rather than cornmeal; the cakes are baked in the hot coals of a fire or fried in fat in a frying pan (skillet).

The Bahamas
In the Bahamas, "johnny cake" refers to a bread made with flour, sugar, butter, and water. After being kneaded, the bread is baked until lightly browned, and has a soft and malleable middle. This bread is usually eaten with soup or on its own. The common bread consumed in the Bahamas in 1725 was made of corn and flour. According to Mark Catesby, an English naturalist who visited North America and the Caribbean in the early 1700s, "Their bread is made of Maiz, or Indian Corn, and also of Wheat; the first they cultivate but not sufficient for their consumption. Wheat is imported to them in Flower from the Northern Colonies."

Dominican Republic

Yaniqueques or yanikeke are a Dominican Republic version of the johnnycake, supposedly brought over in the nineteenth century by English-speaking migrants (possibly of Afro-Caribbean descent). These cakes are made with flour, baking powder, butter and water; they are typically deep-fried. They are a popular beach snack, especially in Boca Chica.

Caribbean Netherlands 
Johnnycakes refer to flat discs of deep-fried bread dough in Curaçao, other Dutch overseas territories and areas with significant Dutch Antillean communities. It is usually leavened with baking powder or soda and generally does not contain cornmeal. It is usually eaten filled with a slice of Gouda cheese or salted cod.

Jamaica
Johnnycake is a traditional staple across the island. Some people call these fried dumplings whilst others say fried johnnycakes. Recipe incorporates flour, sugar, salt, baking powder, margarine or butter and water or milk. Once kneaded, the dough is fried in cooking oil.

United States
The modern johnnycake is a staple in the cuisine of New England, and New Englanders claim it originated in Rhode Island. A modern jonnycake is fried gruel made from yellow or white cornmeal that is mixed with salt and hot water or milk, and sometimes sweetened. In the Southern United States, the same food is referred to as a hoecake.

See also

 American cuisine
 Arepa
 Bannock
 Cornbread
 Corn cookie
 Corn fritters
 Frybread
 Hushpuppy
 Johnnycake Town
 List of maize dishes
 Spoonbread

References

Further reading

 Beaulieu, Linda, The Providence and Rhode Island Cookbook, Guilford, Connecticut: Globe Pequot Press, 2006, .
 Bartlett, John Russell. Dictionary of Americanisms: A Glossary of Words and Phrases Usually Regarded as Peculiar to the United States, fourth edition. Boston: Little, Brown, and Co. (1889
 Hundley, Daniel R., Esq. Social Relations in Our Southern States. New York: Henry B. Price (1860).
 Vogel, William Frederick. "Home Life in Early Indiana". Indiana Magazine of History 10:2 (June 1914) 1-29. Indiana: Indiana University.

American pancakes
Belizean cuisine
Caribbean cuisine
Dominican Republic cuisine
Jamaican cuisine
Maize dishes
New England cuisine
Pancakes
Puerto Rican cuisine
Rhode Island cuisine
Soul food
Cuisine of the Thirteen Colonies
Historical foods
Native American cuisine